Joe Karas was an American politician and businessman.

Born in Rice County, Minnesota, Karas was a farmer and manager of Farm Mutual Fire Insurance Company. He served in local government. He served in the Minnesota House of Representatives 1949-1955 from Pine City, Minnesota.

Notes

Year of birth unknown
Year of death unknown
People from Rice County, Minnesota
People from Pine City, Minnesota
Businesspeople from Minnesota
Members of the Minnesota House of Representatives